Hebertshausen is a municipality in the district of Dachau in Bavaria in Germany.

References

Dachau (district)